Bembecia stiziformis is a moth of the family Sesiidae. It is found on Cyprus and from Turkey to Iran, Turkmenistan and Pakistan.

The larvae feed on the roots of Astragalus species and Tragacanthus aureus, Tragacanthus microcephalus and Tragacanthus zangezurus.

Subspecies
Bembecia stiziformis stiziformis
Bembecia stiziformis fervida (Lederer, 1855)
Bembecia stiziformis tenebrosa (Püngeler, 1914)
Bembecia stiziformis belouchistanica Špatenka, 2001

References

Moths described in 1851
Sesiidae
Moths of Europe
Moths of Asia